Ghostfire Games was a video game developer and publisher based out of Austin, Texas, U.S., founded in late 2007. The company specialized in games for the WiiWare platform. Their final title, Rage of the Gladiator was also released for the 3DS and mobile platforms in 2013.

Origins
Ghostfire Games was started by CEO Ed Roman, a lifelong video game enthusiast, and is his second entrepreneurial venture. Roman first started and sold a company that specialized in advanced enterprise Java technology training and consulting, following his authoring of the book Mastering EJB.

Titles
2008 – Helix (video game) (WiiWare)
2010 – Rage of the Gladiator (WiiWare)

References

External links
Official site

Companies based in Austin, Texas
American companies established in 2007
Video game development companies
Video game companies based in Texas
Video game publishers